Patrick "Deep Dish" Bertoletti is an American competitive eater from Chicago.

Competitive eating career

2007

On July 4, 2007, he finished third in the 92nd annual Nathan's Hot Dog Eating Contest in Coney Island, Brooklyn, New York, having eaten 49 hot dogs and buns in that competition. Only two others have ever eaten more during the contest.

On September 16, 2007, he won the La Costeña "Feel the Heat" Jalapeño Eating Championship in Chicago, Illinois. This competition was marred when the event organizers ran out of jalapeños before the end of the competition.

On October 9, 2007, he upset points leader Joey Chestnut and held off a comeback by second ranked Takeru Kobayashi to win the chicken wing "Chowdown" in Las Vegas shown on Spike TV.

On November 22, 2007, he won Spike TV Major League Eating "Turkey Bowl". Bertoletti consumed  of (whole) turkey in 8 minutes, upsetting the previous year's winner  Joey Chestnut.

2008
On April 12, 2008, he won the ACME Oyster House 2008 World Oyster Eating Championships by downing 35 dozen raw oysters on the half shell in 8 minutes in New Orleans, Louisiana.

On July 4, 2008, he finished 4th at the Nathan's Famous contest, consuming 38 HDB (hot dogs & buns) in the 10-minute contest.

On September 1, 2008, he finished 3rd at the Skyline Chili Spaghetti Eating Contest, consuming  in the 10-minute contest.

On September 28, 2008, he finished in 2nd at the Krystal Square Off, eating 85 Krystal burgers, one more than Takeru "Tsunami" Kobayashi

2009
On March 16, 2009, he won the Stroehmann Sandwich Slamm, eating 16  corned-beef sandwiches in the 10-minute contest.

On July 4, 2009, Patrick placed 3rd in the Nathan's Famous contest, eating 55 HDBs.

On September 2, 2009, Patrick won the Nugget Rib Eating Championship at the Best in the West Nugget Rib Cook-off, eating  of pork rib meat in 12 minutes.

2010
In May, 2010, Patrick became the world poutine eating champion after scarfing down  of gravy-and-cheese-soaked fries in a mere 10 minutes. He edged out 11 fellow stars of Major League Eating and three Canadian amateur eaters by consuming box after box of poutine at Toronto's BMO Field in the first World Poutine Eating Championship.

On July 4, 2010, Patrick took third place in the Nathan's Famous Hot Dog Eating contest by eating 37 hot dogs in ten minutes.

On July 22, 2010, Patrick beat Joey Chestnut to win the Mars Bar eating competition. He ate 38 bars in just over 4 minutes.

2011
On May 1, 2011, Patrick took first place in the La Costeña "Feel the Heat" Jalapeño Eating Championship and set a world record by eating 275 pickled jalapeños in eight minutes.

On June 5, 2011, Patrick took first place in the Acme Oyster House Oyster Eating Contest and set a Louisiana state record by eating 39 dozen (468 individual) oysters in eight minutes.

On July 4, 2011, Patrick took second place in the Nathan's Famous Hot Dog Eating contest by eating 53 hot dogs in ten minutes.

2012
On January 23, 2012, Patrick took first place in The Isle Boonville World Boneless Buffalo Wing Eating Championship by eating  of buffalo wings in 10 minutes.

On July 4th, 2012, Patrick took third place in the Nathan's Hot Dog Eating Contest, eating 51 HDB in ten minutes.

On September 9, 2012, Patrick took first place in Wild Eggs National Pancake Eating Championship by eating 50 king pancakes in 10 minutes.

2013
On February 3, 2013, Patrick took first place in Fat Tuesday King Cake Eating World Championship by eating 12 king cakes in 8 minutes.

On July 3, 2013, Patrick took first place in Z-Burger Independence Burger eating Championship by eating 28 burgers in 10 minutes.

On October 6, 2013, Patrick took second place in Canada's biggest pizza eating contest by eating 39 slices of pizza in 12 minutes.

2014
He set a record for most milk consumed in an hour by drinking .

2015
He won the 2015 Wing Bowl by eating 444 wings in 26 minutes.

2022
After a 10 year retirement from the Nathan's Hot Dog Eating Contest, Bertoletti returned to the competition, eating 33.5 HDB in ten minutes to finish fifth.

World records
 pizza: 47 slices in 10 minutes
Blueberry pie (hands-free):  in 8 minutes
Chicken wings:  in 8 minutes
Chocolate:  in 7 minutes
Corned beef and cabbage:  in 10 minutes
Corned Beef Sandwiches: 11  sandwiches in 10 minutes
Date Nut Bread: 29.5 date nut bread and cream cheese sandwiches in 8 minutes
Doughnuts (cream-filled): 47 glazed and cream-filled doughnuts in 5 minutes
Grits:  in 10 minutes
Ice cream (short form):  vanilla ice cream in 8 minutes
Jalapeño peppers (pickled): 98 after eating 47 donuts in 5 minutes
Jalapeño peppers (pickled): 191 in 6.5 minutes
Jalapeño peppers (pickled): 275 in 8 minutes
Key lime pie:  in 8 minutes
Kolaches: 44 cherry kolaches in 8 minutes
Oysters (short form): 34 dozen in 8 minutes
Peanut butter and jelly sandwiches: 42 sandwiches in 10 minutes
Posole:  in 12 minutes
Shoo-fly pie:  in 8 minutes
Strawberry rhubarb pie:  in  8 minutes
Strawberry shortcake:  in 8 minutes
Waffles: 29  waffles in 10 minutes
Whole turkey:  of roast turkey meat in 12 minutes
Whole turkey (short form):  of roast turkey meat in 8 minutes

Media appearances
Bertoletti was featured on the cover of the Chicago Reader on Friday June 30, 2006. The story described his abilities and his ambitions for the summer competition.

Bertoletti and food truck partner Tim Brown appeared as "Glutton Force 5" on a Season 2 episode of the Food Network's Food Court Wars in March 2014. The pair won for their "Taco in a Bag" concept and were awarded free rent for one year for a location in the food court at Spring Hill Mall located in West Dundee, Illinois as part of their prize.

Personal life
Bertoletti is a graduate of Morgan Park Academy and Kendall College. He was a co-owner and chef of the restaurant "Taco in a Bag" in the Lincoln Square neighborhood of Chicago.

He is an avid reader of the Girl Talk series by author L.E. Blair.

See also
 List of competitive eaters

References

External links
 
 Major League Eating eater profile page

American competitive eaters
Place of birth missing (living people)
Year of birth missing (living people)
Living people
People from Chicago
Morgan Park Academy alumni
Kendall College alumni